Aleppo offensive may refer to:

Operation Northern Storm, a government offensive in early June 2013
West Aleppo Offensive, a rebel offensive in late June 2013
Aleppo offensive (October–December 2013), a government offensive in 2013
Aleppo offensive (July 2015)
Aleppo offensive (October–December 2015)
Aleppo offensive (June–July 2016)
Aleppo offensive (July–August 2016)
Aleppo offensive (August–September 2016)
Aleppo offensive (September–October 2016)
Aleppo offensive (October–November 2016)
Aleppo offensive (November–December 2016)